Audea nigrior is a moth of the family Erebidae. It is found in the Democratic Republic of Congo (Orientale, Bas Congo), Rwanda, South Africa, Eswatini and Tanzania.

References

Moths described in 2005
Audea
Moths of Africa